Riccardo Cocchi (born December 7, 1977, Terni, Italy) is a 10-time undefeated Latin Dance Champion, with his partner, Yulia Zagoruychenko. Currently, he resides in and represents the United States of America. When not busy competing, Riccardo is available for coaching.

History  
Riccardo began his dancing career at the age of 6 at his parents’ dance studio. His first partner was Barbara Mancuso. At first Riccardo appreciated International Ballroom (or Standard) more than Latin. Later he competed for many years in amateur divisions with different partners. When Riccardo started dancing with Joanne Wilkinson, from Australia in 1998, he switched over to Latin completely. Riccardo and Joanne were two times World Amateur Latin Champions, ten times Italian Amateur Champions, Professional Italian Latin Champions, and Professional Grand Finalists at the UK, British and World Championships. He continued dancing with her for ten years until 2007 when the partnership split. Soon afterward Riccardo had the opportunity to dance with Yulia Zagoruychenko. Cocchi and Zagoruychenko won their first World Latin Dance Championship in 2010, and earned their second title in 2011. They are ranked #1 in the world for Professional Latin. They recently won their 5th consecutive National Professional Latin Champions title at the US Open Dance Competition. Apart from active participation in competitions, Riccardo and Yulia take part in shows all over the world. From April 2012 they have been performing in «Dance Legends» in New-York.

Famous coaches 
 Barbara McColl
 Sammy Stopford
 Espen Salberg
 Hans Galke
 Shirley Ballas
 Donnie Burns

Latest titles 

 2005 idsf world amateur latin champion
2010-2019 World Professional Latin Champion
 2009 World Professional Showdance Champion
 2008-2019 U.S. National Professional Latin Champion
 2016-2019 British Open Professional Latin American Dance Champion (Blackpool Dance Festival)
 2012, 2015-2019 Winner of the Elsa Wells International Dance Championships
 2008-2014 U.S. Open Champion
 2008-2011, 2013-2015 DWC Disney Champion (Paris, France)
 2008-2019 Dutch Open Champion
 2010-2016 Asian Open Champion (Tokyo, Japan)
 2013, 2016 Asian Open Champion (Korea and China)
 2010-2014, 2016 Asian Open Champion (Taiwan)
 2010-2012 Asian Open Champion (Indonesia)
 2010-2014 Asian Open Champion (Macao)
 2010-2012 Philippine Star Ball Champion
 2009, 2012, 2013 German Open Champion
 2012, 2016 Asian Pacific Champion

References

External links 
 http://www.rydance.com
 http://ballrooms.su/publ/3-1-0-174
 http://fred-astaire.blogspot.ru/2008/06/spotlight-onriccardo-cocchi.html

1977 births
Living people
Italian emigrants to the United States
American male dancers
American ballroom dancers